Leonard Cecil Grosvenor (July 21, 1905 – March 15, 1981) was a Canadian professional ice hockey player who played 150 games in the National Hockey League with the Ottawa Senators, New York Americans, and Montreal Canadiens between 1927 and 1933.

Career statistics

Regular season and playoffs

External links
 

1905 births
1981 deaths
Bronx Tigers players
Canadian expatriate ice hockey players in the United States
Canadian ice hockey centres
Ice hockey people from Ottawa
London Panthers players
London Tecumsehs players
Montreal Canadiens players
New York Americans players
Ottawa Senators (1917) players